Lagorio is a surname. Notable people with the surname include:

Gina Lagorio (1922–2005), Italian writer
Lelio Lagorio (1925–2017), Italian politician
Lev Lagorio (1826–1905), Russian painter and watercolorist
 (born 1955), Argentine diplomat

Italian-language surnames